Mihai Adrian Mincă (born 8 October 1984) is a footballer who plays as a goalkeeper for CSU Alba Iulia.

Mincă joined Rapid in 2004 from FC Unirea Alba Iulia, where he played on an irregular basis, but since joining has not been a part of the first team. In 2007, he joined Gloria Buzău and at the end of season 2007–2008 he transferred to Astra Ploiesti. On 3 January 2011, he signed a 5-year contract with CFR Cluj.

Honours

Club
Rapid Bucuresti
Cupa României: 2005–06, 2006–07

CFR Cluj
Cupa României: 2015–16

References

External links
 
 

1984 births
Living people
Sportspeople from Alba Iulia
Romanian footballers
Association football goalkeepers
Liga I players
Liga II players
CSM Unirea Alba Iulia players
FC Rapid București players
FC Gloria Buzău players
FC Brașov (1936) players
CFR Cluj players
FC Voluntari players
Nemzeti Bajnokság I players
Kisvárda FC players
Romanian expatriate footballers
Romanian expatriate sportspeople in Hungary
Expatriate footballers in Hungary